Pagan, also Paganus, Pain or Payn, was a masculine given name in use in Europe the Middle Ages. Other forms include French Payen, Païen or Péan, and Italian Pagano.

Pagan I, lord of Haifa in 1107–1112
Pagan the Chancellor (d. bef. 1129), crusader administrator
Pain fitzJohn (d. 1137), Anglo-Norman administrator
Pagan the Butler (d. 1149), crusader baron
Payn, sheriff of Cambridgeshire and Huntingdonshire in 1155–1161
Payn de Beauchamp (d. c. 1157), husband of Rohese de Vere, Countess of Essex
Payn de Rochefort, seneschal of Anjou in 1190
Pagan II, lord of Haifa in 1190s
Pagano della Torre (d. 1365), Italian prelate

See also
Pagan of Bulgaria (d. 768), an unrelated name
Pagan Kennedy (born 1963), zine author